Malba can refer to:

 Malba, Queens, a neighborhood of New York City
 Malba Department, Poni Province, Burkina Faso, a department or commune
 Birifor people, also known as Malba, an ethnic group in West Africa
 Malba Tahan, a fictitious Persian scholar, frequent pen name of Brazilian author Júlio César de Mello e Souza
 MALBA, the Latin American Art Museum of Buenos Aires (Museo de Arte Latinoamericano de Buenos Aires)